Kachug is a rural locality (a village) in Zelentsovskoye Rural Settlement, Nikolsky District, Vologda Oblast, Russia. The population was 31 as of 2002.

Geography 
Kachug is located 74 km northwest of Nikolsk (the district's administrative centre) by road. Vinograd is the nearest rural locality.

References 

Rural localities in Nikolsky District, Vologda Oblast